Aerograd (also referred to as Air City or Frontier) is a 1935 Soviet drama  film by Ukrainian director Oleksandr Dovzhenko, a coproduction between Mosfilm and VUFKU. It is an adventure story set in the Soviet Far East in the future.

Plot
A Russian outpost in Eastern Siberia comes under threat of attack by the Japanese in this patriotic film from 1935. Aerograd is a new town with a strategically located airfield of vital interest to the government. Work on the new outpost is complicated when tensions develop between workers and a religious sect. The sect threatens to give their support to a band of marauding samurai warriors who battle for control of the region. Relations between the two countries are further strained in the days before World War II, dating back to the Russo-Japanese War of 1905. In this feature, the Russians are victorious as airplanes throughout the country come to the aid of the beleaguered new town.

Cast 
Stepan Shagaida as Stepan Glushak
Sergei Stolyarov as Vladimir Glushak
Yevgeniya Melnikova 
Stepan Shkurat as Vasili Khudiakov
Nikon Tabunasov as Young Chukcha
Boris Dobronravov as Aniky Shavanov
Yelena Maksimova as Maria Kudina
Vladimir Uralsky as Yefim Kosa, partisan
 Ekaterina Korchagina-Aleksandrovskaya as old believer

References

External links
 
   (English subtitles)
 
 
 Aerograd at Kinopoisk 

1935 films
Russian drama films
Russian aviation films
Films directed by Alexander Dovzhenko
Mosfilm films
Dovzhenko Film Studios films
1930s Russian-language films
Soviet-era Ukrainian films
Ukrainian black-and-white films
Soviet black-and-white films
Russian Futurist film
Russian-language Ukrainian films
Russian black-and-white films
Films set in Siberia
Samurai films